Stenomorda vittatipennis is a species of beetle in the genus Stenomorda of the family Mordellidae. It was described in 1931.

References

Mordellidae
Beetles described in 1931